Several ships of the Russian Navies have been named Rostislav after Rostislav I of Kiev, including:

, an 84-gun ship of the line launched in 1844
, a pre-dreadnought battleship launched in 1896

Russian Navy ship names